Gabriela Georgieva (born 16 June 1997) is a Bulgarian swimmer. She competed in the women's 50 metre backstroke event at the 2017 World Aquatics Championships.

References

External links
 

1997 births
Living people
Bulgarian female swimmers
Place of birth missing (living people)
Female backstroke swimmers
Competitors at the 2017 Summer Universiade
20th-century Bulgarian women
21st-century Bulgarian women